Juan Manuel Pérez García (born 14 October 1993) is an Argentine footballer.

In 2016, he played for Deportes Colchagua in the Segunda División de Chile.

References
 Profile at BDFA 
 

1993 births
Living people
Argentine footballers
Argentine expatriate footballers
Deportes Colchagua footballers
Magallanes footballers
Primera B de Chile players
Expatriate footballers in Chile
Association football forwards
FC Jumilla players
Footballers from Buenos Aires